Ecsenius frontalis, known commonly as the smooth-fin blenny in Micronesia, is a species of combtooth blenny in the genus Ecsenius. It is found in coral reefs in the western Indian ocean, in several gulfs in the Red Sea. It can reach a maximum length of 8 centimetres. Blennies in this species primarily feed off of plants, including benthic algae and weeds, and are commercial aquarium fish.

References

frontalis
Fish described in 1836